Kevin Barry (1902–1920) was an Irish republican who was hanged.

Kevin Barry may also refer to:

Arts 
 Kevin Barry (writer) (born 1969), Irish writer
 Kevin Barry (playwright) (born 1951), American playwright
 "Kevin Barry" (song), a 1920s popular ballad about the executed Irish republican
 Kevin Barry (Neighbours), a fictional character from the soap opera Neighbours in 1985

Sportspeople 
 Kevin Barry (American football) (born 1979), American football player
 Kevin Barry (baseball) (born 1978), American baseball player
 Kevin Barry (boxer) (born 1959), New Zealand boxing trainer and former light-heavyweight boxer
 Kevin Barry (equestrian) (born 1920), Irish Olympic equestrian
 Kevin Barry Sr. (c. 1936–2011), his father, New Zealand boxing trainer
 Kevin Barry (footballer) (born 1961), English football goalkeeper
 Kevin Barry (rugby league) (1950–2012), New Zealand rugby league international
 Kevin Barry (rugby union) (1936–2014), New Zealand rugby union player

See also 
 Kevin Berry (1945–2006), Australian swimmer